Ramapriya (pronounced rāmapriya) is a rāgam in Carnatic music (musical scale of South Indian classical music). It is the 52nd melakarta rāgam (parent scale) in the 72 melakarta scale system of Carnatic music. It is called Ramāmanōhari in Muthuswami Dikshitar school of Carnatic music.

Structure and Lakshana

It is the 4th rāgam in the 9th chakra Brahma. The mnemonic name is Brahma-Bhu. The mnemonic phrase is sa ra gu mi pa dhi ni. Its  structure (ascending and descending scale) is as follows (see swaras in Carnatic music for details on below notation and terms):
: 
: 

(the notes shuddha rishabham, antara gandharam, prati madhyamam, chathusruthi dhaivatham, kaisiki nishadham are used in this scale)

As it is a melakarta rāgam, by definition it is a sampoorna rāgam (has all seven notes in ascending and descending scale). It is the prati madhyamam equivalent of Chakravakam, which is the 16th melakarta scale.

Janya rāgams 
Ramapriya has a few minor janya rāgams (derived scales) associated with it. See List of janya rāgams for full list of rāgams associated with Ramapriya scale.

Compositions 
Here are some compositions sung in concerts, set to Ramapriya.

Saamodam Paripaalaya by Swathi Thirunal Rama Varma
Mahadevamanisham by Mangalampalli Balamuralikrishna
Smaramyaham sada rahum and Matangi Sri rajarajeshwari by Muthuswami Dikshitar
Korinavara mosagu by Patnam Subramania Iyer
"Sandehamunu deerpavayya" by thyagaraja 
"sri raja rajeshwari" by thanjavuru ponnayya pillai

Film Songs

Language: Tamil

Related rāgams 
This section covers the theoretical and scientific aspect of this rāgam.

Ramapriya's notes when shifted using Graha bhedam, yields no other melakarta rāgam, as such a step taken on any of the 6 swarams (Ri to Ni) comes up with scales that do not conform to the melakarta rules. Graha bhedam is the step taken in keeping the relative note frequencies same, while shifting the shadjam to the next note in the rāgam.

Notes

References

Melakarta ragas